Herbert Crowther (28 October 1882 – 13 October 1916) was a British cyclist. He won two silver medals at the 1906 Intercalated Games and competed in one event at the 1908 Summer Olympics.

References

External links
 

1882 births
1916 deaths
British male cyclists
Olympic cyclists of Great Britain
Cyclists at the 1906 Intercalated Games
Cyclists at the 1908 Summer Olympics
Sportspeople from Dewsbury
Medalists at the 1906 Intercalated Games
Cyclists who died while racing
Sport deaths in England